Federico Spoliansky is an Argentine filmmaker, poet and writer. He was born in Buenos Aires, and studied psychology at the University of Buenos Aires.

In 1996, he was a semifinalist at the International Poetry Competition organized by the Atlanta Review.

In 1998, he directed scenes from the opera La Dama de Picas by Tchaikovsky while studying at the Instituto Superior de Arte del Teatro Colón in Buenos Aires. That same year, he helped to stage Pygmalion at the British Arts Center in the capital.

In 1999, he directed Steel Magnolias starring Isabella Entwistle at The Playhouse in San Isidro. He has also been a director of photography for several short and medium-length films and has worked in advertising under the direction of figures such as Juan José Jusid, Edi Flehner and Edgardo Estevez. His films include Cest Tout and I & Thou; the latter was screened at several film festivals at home and abroad.

As a writer, he has published several books such as El Agujero (1995), Duda Patron (2010) and Atlántov (2016).

In October 2018 he was visiting scholar at Brown University.

References

Argentine writers
Living people
Year of birth missing (living people)